The 1950 United Kingdom general election was the first ever to be held after a full term of Labour government. The election was held on Thursday 23 February 1950, and was the first held following the abolition of plural voting and university constituencies. The government's 1945 lead over the Conservative Party shrank dramatically, and Labour was returned to power but with an overall majority reduced from 146 to just 5. There was a 2.8% national swing towards the Conservatives, who gained 90 seats. Labour called another general election in 1951, which the Conservative Party won.

Turnout increased to 83.9%, the highest turnout in a UK general election under universal suffrage, and representing an increase of more than 11% in comparison to 1945.

It was also the first general election to be covered on television, although the footage was not recorded. Richard Dimbleby hosted the BBC coverage of the election, which he would later do again for the 1951, 1955, 1959 and the 1964 general elections. On this occasion, Dimbleby was joined in the BBC Lime Grove Studios by R. B. McCallum, Fellow of Pembroke College, Oxford, and author of The British General Election of 1945, and David Butler, research student of Nuffield College. The first election night programme ran from 10:45 pm until just after 1:00 am.

Background

Significant changes since the 1945 general election included the abolition of plural voting by the Representation of the People Act 1948, and a major reorganisation of constituencies by the House of Commons (Redistribution of Seats) Act 1949. Eleven new English seats were created and six were abolished, and there were over 170 major alterations to constituencies across the country. Parliament was dissolved on 3 February 1950.

Campaign

The Conservatives, having recovered from their landslide election defeat in 1945, accepted most of the welfare state and nationalisation that had taken place under the Attlee government, which included the National Health Service and the mixed economy. The Tory manifesto, "This Is The Road" accepted the new welfare state’s foundations but focused on the loss of freedoms and aspirations since 1945. Churchill claimed Attlee had not “levelled up” but had actually “levelled down”. The campaign essentially focused on the possible future nationalisation of other sectors and industries, which was supported by the Labour Party, and opposed by the Conservatives. The Liberals essentially viewed the struggle between the two parties on this issue as a class struggle.

One of the major election issues was the rationing still in effect on petrol, confectionery and meats over five years after the end of the war. The Conservative Party promised to phase out rationing while Labour campaigned for its continuation.

Analysis showed that Labour suffered huge losses of seats due to a “revolt of the suburbs”, with substantial swings against them among Middle England voters in London, the Home Counties, Essex and Middlesex. The effects of the Labour government's austerity, and inflation had hit middle income voters hard. In particular, rationing of basic foods like bread and powdered egg were incredibly unpopular. While campaigning in Leicester, Attlee was met with “catcalls” and chants of “vermin” while Hugh Gaitskell sensed there was “a collection of grievances among the lower middle class and middle class” against Labour. 

The Liberal Party fielded 475 candidates, more than at any general election since 1929. Liberal Party leader Clement Davies felt that the party had been at a disadvantage at the 1945 general election when they ran fewer candidates than needed to form a government. Davies arranged for the cost of running extra candidates to be offset by the party taking out insurance with Lloyd's of London against more than fifty candidates losing their deposits. In the event, the strategy only succeeded in causing a very marginal increase in the overall Liberal vote over the previous election (albeit it was still their best popular vote percentage since 1929); the number of votes-per-candidate declined sharply, resulting in them losing a further three seats from their already-disappointing 1945 showing. A total of 319 Liberal candidates lost their deposits, a record number until the 2015 general election, when candidates for the Liberal Democrats lost 335 deposits at the general election held in that year.

Results

Despite losing 78 seats, the Labour Party won an overall majority of 5 seats, down from 146 in the previous election, while their vote share slightly declined. The Conservatives saw a resurgence in their support, gaining an additional 90 seats and saw their vote share improve by more than 4%.

Prominent personalities entering Parliament in this election included Edward Heath (Bexley), Jo Grimond (Orkney and Shetland), Enoch Powell (Wolverhampton South West), Reginald Maudling (Barnet) and Iain Macleod (Enfield West).

Scottish politician Willie Gallacher lost his West Fife seat to Labour; he was the longest-serving Member of Parliament (from 1935 to 1950) and the last MP in Parliament for the Communist Party of Great Britain. 

The election began the fractionalization of the Labour Party into Bevanite and Gaitskellite factions after Hugh Gaitskell blamed Aneurin Bevan for their party's disappointing performance, leading to a growing rift between the two.  

|}

Votes summary

Seats summary

See also
List of MPs elected in the 1950 United Kingdom general election
1950 United Kingdom general election in Northern Ireland

Notes

References

Sources

External links

United Kingdom election results—summary results 1885–1979

Manifestos
This is the Road: The Conservative and Unionist Party's Policy, 1950 Conservative Party manifesto
Let Us Win Through Together: A Declaration of Labour Policy for the Consideration of the Nation, 1950 Labour Party manifesto
No Easy Way: Britain's Problems and the Liberal Answers, 1950 Liberal Party manifesto

 
1950
General election
Austerity in the United Kingdom (1939–1954)
General election
Electoral history of Winston Churchill
Clement Attlee